is a Japanese former entertainer, model, and actress. She is represented by Platinum Production. Among numerous other television and film appearances, she played the lead role in the film adaptation of Kaoruko Himeno's novel .

Career
Iwasa was Miss Magazine 2003. She was awarded the Graph Prize, the 42nd Golden Arrow Awards (2004) in March 2005.

In June 2005, Iwasa recorded a duet with Naoya Ogawa called "Katte ni Shinryakusha" (An Invader in My Own Way), which was used as an ending song of Sgt. Frog. The two appeared on Music Station and Pop Jam. Iwasa was in the drama Gal Circle as Rika, a ganguro girl who scams her friends for money.

On October 1, 2020, she announced her decision to retire from the entertainment industry and take a new career of nursing care.

Filmography

Films
Sayonara Midori-chan (2004)
Space Police (2004)
Shibuya Kaidan: Sa-chan no Toshi Densetsu (2004)
Chicken Deka (2004)
Umeku Haisuikan (2004)
Omoi no Iro (2004)
Swing Girls (2004) - Chie
Einstein Girl (2005)
Space Police (2005)
Sugar and Spice: Fumi zekka | Shuga & Supaisu Fumi Zekka (2006) - Yoko
Carved 2 | Kuchisake-onna 2 (2008) - Yukie Sawada
Kujira: Gokudo no Shokutaku (2009)
Beautiful Female Panther: Body Sniper | Utsukushiki mehyo: Body sniper (2010)
Tensou Sentai Goseiger Returns! The Last Epic (2011)
Koitani Bashi: La Vallee de l'amour (2011)
MILOCRORZE - A Love Story (2012) - Yukine
Actress (2012) - Akari Hazuki
Shinobido (2012)
 (2013) - Francesco
009-1: The End of the Beginning (2013)
 (2013) - Mayuko Iwasa
Her Granddaughter (2015)

TV Movies

Television dramas

References

External links
 Official site 
 
 

1987 births
Living people
People from Nerima
Japanese gravure models
Japanese voice actresses
Japanese television personalities